The Colorado Rockies' 2008 season was the team's 16th season overall. The Rockies attempted to repeat their previous season's success after making it to the World Series; however, they ended up finishing third place in the National League West with a record of 74-88.  The Rockies drew 2,650,218 fans for the season, their highest total since 2002.  The average home attendance was 33,127 fans.

Offseason
December 7, 2007: Jamey Carroll was traded by the Colorado Rockies to the Cleveland Indians for a player to be named later. The Cleveland Indians sent Sean Smith (minors) (April 24, 2008) to the Colorado Rockies to complete the trade.
December 13, 2007: Kip Wells and Luis Vizcaíno were signed as free agents by the Colorado Rockies.
February 17, 2008: Scott Podsednik was signed as a free agent by the Colorado Rockies.
March 26, 2008: Ramón Ramírez was traded by the Colorado Rockies to the Kansas City Royals for a player to be named later. The Kansas City Royals sent Jorge de la Rosa (April 30, 2008) to the Colorado Rockies to complete the trade.

Regular season

Season standings

Record vs. opponents

Transactions
April 30, 2008: Jason Grilli was traded by the Detroit Tigers to the Colorado Rockies for Zach Simons (minors).
May 16, 2008: Glendon Rusch was signed as a free agent by the Colorado Rockies.
August 6, 2008: Liván Hernández was selected off waivers by the Colorado Rockies from the Minnesota Twins.
August 14, 2008: Kip Wells was released by the Colorado Rockies.

Major League debuts
Batters:
Jayson Nix (Apr 1)
Jonathan Herrera (Apr 30)
Doug Bernier (Jun 17)
Dexter Fowler (Sep 2)
Pitchers:
Greg Reynolds (May 11)
Cedrick Bowers (Jul 2)
Steven Register (Aug 4)

Game log

|- bgcolor="#bbbbbb"
| – || March 31 || @ Cardinals ||colspan=6|Postponed (rain) Rescheduled for April 1
|-

|- align="center" bgcolor="bbffbb"
| 1 || April 1 || @ Cardinals || 2–1 || Buchholz (1–0) || Franklin (0–1) || Corpas (1) || 45,996 || 1–0
|- align="center" bgcolor="ffbbbb"
| 2 || April 2 || @ Cardinals || 8–3 || Wellemeyer (1–0) || Cook (0–1) || || 39,915 || 1–1
|- align="center" bgcolor="ffbbbb"
| 3 || April 3 || @ Cardinals || 3–0 || Thompson (1–0) || Jiménez (0–1) || Isringhausen (1) || 33,748 || 1–2
|- align="center" bgcolor="ffbbbb"
| 4 || April 4 || Diamondbacks || 8–1 || Owings (1–0) || Redman (0–1) || || 49,233 || 1–3
|- align="center" bgcolor="ffbbbb"
| 5 || April 5 || Diamondbacks || 7–2 || Webb (2–0) || Francis (0–1) || || 43,124 || 1–4
|- align="center" bgcolor="ffbbbb"
| 6 || April 6 || Diamondbacks || 5–2 (10) || Lyon (1–1) || Bowie (0–1) || Qualls (1) || 42,865 || 1–5
|- align="center" bgcolor="bbffbb"
| 7 || April 7 || Braves || 2–1 || Herges (1–0) || Boyer (0–2) || Corpas (2) || 24,304 || 2–5
|- align="center" bgcolor="bbffbb"
| 8 || April 8 || Braves || 4–3 || Jiménez (1–1) || Jurrjens (1–1) || Corpas (3) || 24,640 || 3–5
|- align="center" bgcolor="bbffbb"
| 9 || April 9 || Braves || 12–6 || Redman (1–1) || James (0–1) || || 23,210 || 4–5
|- align="center" bgcolor="#bbbbbb"
| – || April 10 || Braves ||colspan=6|Postponed (snow) Rescheduled for June 16
|- align="center" bgcolor="ffbbbb"
| 10 || April 11 || @ Diamondbacks || 8–2 || Webb (3–0) || Francis (0–2) || || 31,732 || 4–6
|- align="center" bgcolor="ffbbbb"
| 11 || April 12 || @ Diamondbacks || 10–3 || Haren (2–0) || Morales (0–1) || || 29,256 || 4–7
|- align="center" bgcolor="bbffbb"
| 12 || April 13 || @ Diamondbacks || 13–5 || Cook (1–1) || González (0–1) || || 31,321 || 5–7
|- align="center" bgcolor="ffbbbb"
| 13 || April 15 || @ Padres || 6–0 || Wolf (1–0) || Jiménez (1–2) || || 24,439 || 5–8
|- align="center" bgcolor="bbffbb"
| 14 || April 16 || @ Padres || 10–2 || Redman (2–1) || Germano (0–1) || || 21,730 || 6–8
|- align="center" bgcolor="bbffbb"
| 15 || April 17 || @ Padres || 2–1 (22) || Wells  (1–0) || Rusch (0–1) || || 25,984 || 7–8
|- align="center" bgcolor="bbffbb"
| 16 || April 18 || @ Astros || 11–5 || Morales (1–1) || Sampson (0–2) || || 34,272 || 8–8
|- align="center" bgcolor="bbffbb"
| 17 || April 19 || @ Astros || 3–2 || Cook (2–1) || Villarreal (0–3) || Corpas (4) || 34,540 || 9–8
|- align="center" bgcolor="ffbbbb"
| 18 || April 20 || @ Astros || 6–4 || Wright (2–0) || Fuentes (0–1) || Valverde (2) || 35,286 || 9–9
|- align="center" bgcolor="ffbbbb"
| 19 || April 21 || Phillies || 9–5 || Seánez (2–1) || Buchholz (1–1) ||  || 24,886 || 9–10
|- align="center" bgcolor="ffbbbb"
| 20 || April 22 || Phillies || 8–6 || Madson (1–0) || Corpas (0–1) || Lidge (4) || 26,665 || 9–11
|- align="center" bgcolor="ffbbbb"
| 21 || April 23 || Cubs || 7–6 (10) || Wood (2–0) || Wells (1–1) || Mármol (2) || 36,864 || 9–12
|- align="center" bgcolor="bbffbb"
| 22 || April 24 || Cubs || 4–2 || Cook (3–1) || Hart (2–1) || Fuentes (1) || 32,791 || 10–12
|- align="center" bgcolor="ffbbbb"
| 23 || April 25 || @ Dodgers || 8–7 (13) || Park (1–0) || Buchholz (1–2) || || 53,205 || 10–13
|- align="center" bgcolor="ffbbbb"
| 24 || April 26 || @ Dodgers || 11–3 || Penny (4–2) || Redman (2–2) || || 50,469 || 10–14
|- align="center" bgcolor="ffbbbb"
| 25 || April 27 || @ Dodgers || 3–2 (10) || Beimel (1–0) || Corpas (0–2) || || 50,670 || 10–15
|- align="center" bgcolor="ffbbbb"
| 26 || April 28 || @ Giants || 4–0 || Cain (1–2)  || Morales (1–2) || || 30,153 || 10–16
|- align="center" bgcolor="bbffbb"
| 27 || April 29 || @ Giants || 3–2 || Cook (4–1) || Lincecum (4–1) || Fuentes (2) || 32,176 || 11–16
|- align="center" bgcolor="ffbbbb"
| 28 || April 30 || @ Giants || 3–2 || Valdéz (1–0) || Speier (0–1) || Wilson (9) || 30,509 || 11–17
|-

|- align="center" bgcolor="ffbbbb"
| 29 || May 2 || Dodgers || 11–6 || Penny (5–2) || Francis (0–3) || || 30,291 || 11–18
|- align="center" bgcolor="ffbbbb"
| 30 || May 3 || Dodgers || 12–7 || Kuo (1–1) || de la Rosa (0–1) || || 38,597 || 11–19
|- align="center" bgcolor="bbffbb"
| 31 || May 4 || Dodgers || 7–2 || Cook (5–1) || Lowe (2–2) || Buchholz (1) || 43,726 || 12–19
|- align="center" bgcolor="ffbbbb"
| 32 || May 5 || Cardinals || 6–5 || Flores (1–0) || Fuentes (0–2) || Isringhausen (11) || 28,183 || 12–20
|- align="center" bgcolor="ffbbbb"
| 33 || May 6 || Cardinals || 6–5 || Looper (5–1) || Redman (2–3) || Franklin (1) || 25,460 || 12–21
|- align="center" bgcolor="bbffbb"
| 34 || May 7 || Cardinals || 4–3 || Speier (1–1) || Isringhausen (1–3) || Fuentes (3) || 25,432 || 13–21
|- align="center" bgcolor="bbffbb"
| 35 || May 8 || Cardinals || 9–3 || de la Rosa (1–1) || Lohse (3–2) || || 25,376 || 14–21
|- align="center" bgcolor="bbffbb"
| 36 || May 9 || @ Padres || 4–2 || Cook (6–1) || Peavy (4–2) || Fuentes (4) || 31,057 || 15–21
|- align="center" bgcolor="ffbbbb"
| 37 || May 10 || @ Padres || 3–2 || Maddux (3–3) || Jiménez (1–3) || Hoffman (6) || 34,117 || 15–22
|- align="center" bgcolor="ffbbbb"
| 38 || May 11 || @ Padres || 6–1 || Young (3–3) || Reynolds (0–1) || || 28,624 || 15–23
|- align="center" bgcolor="ffbbbb"
| 39 || May 13 || @ Diamondbacks || 8–4 || Johnson (3–1) || Francis (0–4) || || 27,292 || 15–24
|- align="center" bgcolor="ffbbbb"
| 40 || May 14 || @ Diamondbacks || 4–3 || Owings (5–1) || de la Rosa (1–2) || Lyon (11) || 23,127 || 15–25
|- align="center" bgcolor="ffbbbb"
| 41 || May 15 || @ Diamondbacks || 8–5  || Webb (9–0) || Cook (6–2) || Lyon (12) || 21,447 || 15–26
|- align="center" bgcolor="ffbbbb"
| 42 || May 16 || Twins || 4–2 || Blackburn (4–2) || Jiménez (1–4) || Nathan (13) || 35,336 || 15–27
|- align="center" bgcolor="bbffbb"
| 43 || May 17 || Twins || 3–2 || Herges (2–0) || Hernández (6–2) || Fuentes (5) || 43,149 || 16–27
|- align="center" bgcolor="bbffbb"
| 44 || May 18 || Twins || 6–2 || Francis (1–4) || Slowey (0–4) || || 40,326 || 17–27
|- align="center" bgcolor="bbffbb"
| 45 || May 19 || Giants || 4–3 || Grilli (1–0) || Chulk (0–3) || Fuentes (6) || 28,362 || 18–27
|- align="center" bgcolor="ffbbbb"
| 46 || May 20 || Giants || 6–5 || Lincecum (6–1) || Cook (6–3) || Wilson (13) || 28,361 || 18–28
|- align="center" bgcolor="ffbbbb"
| 47 || May 21 || Giants || 3–2 (10) || Walker (2–2) || Herges (2–1) || Wilson (14) || 27,081 || 18–29
|- align="center" bgcolor="bbffbb"
| 48 || May 23 || Mets || 6–5 (13) || Buchholz (2–2) || Heilman (0–1) || || 33,341 || 19–29
|- align="center" bgcolor="ffbbbb"
| 49 || May 24 || Mets || 9–2 || Vargas (1–2) || Francis (1–5) || || 38,142 || 19–30
|- align="center" bgcolor="bbffbb"
| 50 || May 25 || Mets || 4–1 || Cook (7–3) || Maine (5–4) || || 42,123 || 20–30
|- align="center" bgcolor="ffbbbb"
| 51 || May 26 || @ Phillies || 20–5 || Moyer (5–3) || de la Rosa (1–3) || || 44,764 || 20–31
|- align="center" bgcolor="ffbbbb"
| 52 || May 27 || @ Phillies || 7–4 || Kendrick (4–2) || Jiménez (1–5) || || 34,716 || 20–32
|- align="center" bgcolor="ffbbbb"
| 53 || May 28 || @ Phillies || 6–1 || Eaton (1–3) || Reynolds (0–2) || || 39,845 || 20–33
|- align="center" bgcolor="ffbbbb"
| 54 || May 29 || @ Cubs || 8–4 || Wuertz (1–1) || Herges (2–2) || || 39,851 || 20–34
|- align="center" bgcolor="ffbbbb"
| 55 || May 30 || @ Cubs || 10–9 || Eyre (2–0) || Corpas (0–3) || Wood (13) || 39,686 || 20–35
|- align="center" bgcolor="ffbbbb"
| 56 || May 31 || @ Cubs || 5–4 || Dempster (7–2) || Rusch (1–3) || Mármol (3) || 41,529 || 20–36
|-

|- align="center" bgcolor="ffbbbb"
| 57 || June 1 || @ Cubs || 5–3 || Gallagher (3–1) || Jiménez (1–6) || Wood (14) || 41,730 || 20–37
|- align="center" bgcolor="ffbbbb"
| 58 || June 2 || @ Dodgers || 8–2 || Lowe (3–5) || Reynolds (0–3) || || 39,098 || 20–38
|- align="center" bgcolor="bbffbb"
| 59 || June 3 || @ Dodgers || 3–0 || Francis (2–5) || Penny (5–7) || Fuentes (7) || 38,548 || 21–38
|- align="center" bgcolor="bbffbb"
| 60 || June 4 || @ Dodgers || 2–1 || Cook (8–3) || Kershaw (0–1) || Fuentes (8) || 36,393 || 22–38
|- align="center" bgcolor="bbffbb"
| 61 || June 6 || Brewers || 6–4 || Corpas (1–3) || Mota (2–4) || Fuentes (9) || 30,558 || 23–38
|- align="center" bgcolor="bbffbb"
| 62 || June 7 || Brewers || 7–2 || Reynolds (1–3) || Bush (2–6) || || 37,283 || 24–38
|- align="center" bgcolor="ffbbbb"
| 63 || June 8 || Brewers || 3–2 || Suppan (4–4) || Francis (2–6) || Torres (7) || 32,256 || 24–39
|- align="center" bgcolor="bbffbb"
| 64 || June 10 || Giants || 10–5 || Cook (9–3) || Misch (0–3) || || 28,359 || 25–39
|- align="center" bgcolor="bbffbb"
| 65 || June 11 || Giants || 1–0 || Fuentes (1–2) || Yabu (2–3) || || 26,235 || 26–39
|- align="center" bgcolor="ffbbbb"
| 66 || June 12 || Giants || 10–7 || Sánchez (6–3) || Reynolds (1–4) || Wilson (19) || 30,376 || 26–40
|- align="center" bgcolor="ffbbbb"
| 67 || June 13 || @ White Sox || 5–4 || Thornton (3–1) || Herges (2–3) || Jenks (16) || 30,143 || 26–41
|- align="center" bgcolor="bbffbb"
| 68 || June 14 || @ White Sox || 2–0 || Grilli (2–0) || Dotel (3–4) || Fuentes (10) || 35,663 || 27–41
|- align="center" bgcolor="bbffbb"
| 69 || June 15 || @ White Sox || 5–3 || Cook (10–3) || Contreras (6–5) || Fuentes (11) || 32,004 || 28–41
|- align="center" bgcolor="ffbbbb"
| 70 || June 16 || Braves || 7–1 || Jurrjens (7–3) || Jiménez (1–7) || || 25,120 || 28–42
|- align="center" bgcolor="bbffbb"
| 71 || June 17 || Indians || 10–2 || Reynolds (2–4) || Byrd (3–7) || || 28,146 || 29–42
|- align="center" bgcolor="bbffbb"
| 72 || June 18 || Indians || 4–2 || Francis (3–6) || Laffey (4–4) || Fuentes (12) || 28,339 || 30–42
|- align="center" bgcolor="bbffbb"
| 73 || June 19 || Indians || 6–3 || de la Rosa (2–3) || Sowers (0–2) || Fuentes (13) || 33,174 || 31–42
|- align="center" bgcolor="ffbbbb"
| 74 || June 20 || Mets || 7–2 || Maine (7–5) || Cook (10–4) || || 30,411 || 31–43
|- align="center" bgcolor="bbffbb"
| 75 || June 21 || Mets || 7–1 || Jiménez (2–7) || Martínez (2–1) || || 35,637 || 32–43
|- align="center" bgcolor="ffbbbb"
| 76 || June 22 || Mets || 3–1 || Pelfrey (4–6) || Reynolds (2–5) || Wagner (17) || 45,019 || 32–44
|- align="center" bgcolor="ffbbbb"
| 77 || June 23 || @ Royals || 8–4 || Bannister (7–6) || Francis (3–7) || || 12,260 || 32–45
|- align="center" bgcolor="ffbbbb"
| 78 || June 24 || @ Royals || 7–3 || Greinke (7–4) || de la Rosa (2–4) || || 19,169 || 32–46
|- align="center" bgcolor="ffbbbb"
| 79 || June 25 || @ Royals || 4–2 || Hochevar (5–5) || Cook (10–5) || Soria (21) || 16,615 || 32–47
|- align="center" bgcolor="ffbbbb"
| 80 || June 27 || @ Tigers || 7–1 || Bonine (2–0) || Jiménez (2–8) || || 40,842 || 32–48
|- align="center" bgcolor="ffbbbb"
| 81 || June 28 || @ Tigers || 7–6 || Dolsi (1–2) || Fuentes (1–3) || || 42,729 || 32–49
|- align="center" bgcolor="ffbbbb"
| 82 || June 29 || @ Tigers || 4–3 || Rogers (6–5) || Reynolds (2–6) || Jones (15) || 41,305 || 32–50
|- align="center" bgcolor="ffbbbb"
| 83 || June 30 || Padres || 15–8 || Bell (6–3) || Fuentes (1–4) || || 43,248 || 32–51
|-

|- align="center" bgcolor="bbffbb"
| 84 || July 1 || Padres || 4–0 || Cook (11–5) || Banks (2–3) || || 26,221 || 33–51
|- align="center" bgcolor="bbffbb"
| 85 || July 2 || Padres || 8–1 || Jiménez (3–8) || Wolf (5–8) || || 28,377 || 34–51
|- align="center" bgcolor="bbffbb"
| 86 || July 3 || Marlins || 6–5 (11) || Herges (3–3) || Gregg (6–3) || || 48,084 || 35–51
|- align="center" bgcolor="bbffbb"
| 87 || July 4 || Marlins || 18–17 || Buchholz (3–2) || Gregg (6–4) || || 48,691 || 36–51
|- align="center" bgcolor="bbffbb"
| 88 || July 5 || Marlins || 12–6 || de la Rosa (3–4) || Tucker (2–3) || || 35,137 || 37–51
|- align="center" bgcolor="ffbbbb"
| 89 || July 6 || Marlins || 10–5 || Volstad (1–0) || Cook (11–6) || || 27,168 || 37–52
|- align="center" bgcolor="bbffbb"
| 90 || July 7 || @ Brewers || 4–3 || Jiménez (4–8) || McClung (5–4) || Fuentes (14) || 35,161 || 38–52
|- align="center" bgcolor="ffbbbb"
| 91 || July 8 || @ Brewers || 7–3 || Sabathia (7–8) || Redman (2–4) || || 42,533 || 38–53
|- align="center" bgcolor="bbffbb"
| 92 || July 9 || @ Brewers || 8–3 || Rusch (2–3) || Sheets (10–3) || || 37,092 || 39–53
|- align="center" bgcolor="ffbbbb"
| 93 || July 10 || @ Brewers || 11–1 || Bush (5–8) || de la Rosa (3–5) || || 43,389 || 39–54
|- align="center" bgcolor="ffbbbb"
| 94 || July 11 || @ Mets || 2–1 || Feliciano (2–2) || Buchholz (3–3) || Wagner (21) || 49,016 || 39–55
|- align="center" bgcolor="ffbbbb"
| 95 || July 12 || @ Mets || 3–0 || Muñiz (1–1) || Jiménez (4–9) || Wagner (22) || 54,137 || 39–56
|- align="center" bgcolor="ffbbbb"
| 96 || July 13 || @ Mets || 7–0 || Pelfrey (8–6) || Redman (2–5) || || 51,293 || 39–57
|- align="center" bgcolor="bbffbb"
| 97 || July 17 || Pirates || 5–3 || Jiménez (5–9) || Maholm (6–6) || Fuentes (15) || 30,584 || 40–57
|- align="center" bgcolor="bbffbb"
| 98 || July 18 || Pirates || 5–2 || Rusch (3–3) || Snell (3–8) || Fuentes (16) || 37,114 || 41–57
|- align="center" bgcolor="bbffbb"
| 99 || July 19 || Pirates || 7–1 || de la Rosa (4–5) || Herrera (0–1) || || 44,565 || 42–57
|- align="center" bgcolor="bbffbb"
| 100 || July 20 || Pirates || 11–3 || Cook (12–6) || Duke (4–7) || || 30,488 || 43–57
|- align="center" bgcolor="ffbbbb"
| 101 || July 21 || Dodgers || 16–10 || Falkenborg (2–2) || Wells (1–2) || || 38,291 || 43–58
|- align="center" bgcolor="bbffbb"
| 102 || July 22 || Dodgers || 10–1 || Jiménez (6–9) || Kershaw (0–3) || || 41,567 || 44–58
|- align="center" bgcolor="bbffbb"
| 103 || July 23 || Dodgers || 5–3 || Rusch (4–3) || Kuroda (5–7) || Fuentes (17) || 36,305 || 45–58
|- align="center" bgcolor="bbffbb"
| 104 || July 25 || @ Reds || 7–2 || Cook (13–6) || Vólquez (12–4) || || 27,501 || 46–58
|- align="center" bgcolor="bbffbb"
| 105 || July 26 || @ Reds || 5–1 || de la Rosa (5–5) || Bailey (0–4) || || 33,981 || 47–58
|- align="center" bgcolor="bbffbb"
| 106 || July 27 || @ Reds || 11–0 || Jiménez (7–9) || Fogg (2–3) || || 28,246 || 48–58
|- align="center" bgcolor="ffbbbb"
| 107 || July 28 || @ Pirates || 8–4 || Snell (4–8) || Grilli (2–1) || || 15,303 || 48–59
|- align="center" bgcolor="ffbbbb"
| 108 || July 29 || @ Pirates || 6–4 || Davis (1–0) || Herges (3–4) || Yates (1) || 17,507 || 48–60
|- align="center" bgcolor="bbffbb"
| 109 || July 30 || @ Pirates || 7–4 || Cook (14–6) || Duke (4–9) || Fuentes (18) || 16,587 || 49–60
|- align="center" bgcolor="ffbbbb"
| 110 || July 31 || @ Marlins || 12–2 || Sánchez (1–0) || de la Rosa (5–6) || || 13,634 || 49–61
|-

|- align="center" bgcolor="bbffbb"
| 111 || August 1 || @ Marlins || 5–2 || Jiménez (8–9) || Volstad (2–2) || Fuentes (19) || 16,555 || 50–61
|- align="center" bgcolor="ffbbbb"
| 112 || August 2 || @ Marlins || 5–3 || Nolasco (11–6) || De Los Santos (0–1) || Gregg (24) || 22,324 || 50–62
|- align="center" bgcolor="bbffbb"
| 113 || August 3 || @ Marlins || 3–2 || Buchholz (4–3) || Nelson (2–1) || Fuentes (20) || 14,310 || 51–62
|- align="center" bgcolor="ffbbbb"
| 114 || August 4 || Nationals || 9–4 || Redding (8–6) || Cook (14–7) || || 33,143 || 51–63
|- align="center" bgcolor="bbffbb"
| 115 || August 5 || Nationals || 8–2 || Corpas (2–3) || Ayala (1–7) || || 27,483 || 52–63
|- align="center" bgcolor="#bbbbbb"
| – || August 6 || Nationals ||colspan=6|Postponed (rain) Rescheduled for August 7
|- align="center" bgcolor="ffbbbb"
| 116 || August 7 || Nationals || 6–3 || Bergmann (2–8) || Francis (3–8) || Hanrahan (2) || || 52–64
|- align="center" bgcolor="ffbbbb"
| 117 || August 7 || Nationals || 6–3 || Pérez (5–8) || Jiménez (8–10) || Hanrahan (3) || 30,448 || 52–65
|- align="center" bgcolor="bbffbb"
| 118 || August 8 || Padres || 6–3 || Rusch (5–3) || Peavy (8–8) || Fuentes (21) || 33,147 || 53–65
|- align="center" bgcolor="ffbbbb"
| 119 || August 9 || Padres || 8–3 || Maddux (6–8) || Cook (14–8) || Hoffman (25) || 41,640 || 53–66
|- align="center" bgcolor="ffbbbb"
| 120 || August 10 || Padres || 16–7 || Hampson (1–1) || Hernández (10–9) || || 45,660 || 53–67
|- align="center" bgcolor="ffbbbb"
| 121 || August 12 || Diamondbacks || 4–2 || Johnson (10–8) || Jiménez (8–11) || Lyon (25) || 31,218 || 53–68
|- align="center" bgcolor="bbffbb"
| 122 || August 13 || Diamondbacks || 6–5 || Buchholz (5–3) || Rauch (4–3) || Fuentes (22) || 30,247 || 54–68
|- align="center" bgcolor="ffbbbb"
| 123 || August 14 || Diamondbacks || 6–2 || Haren (13–6) || Rusch (5–4) || || 27,575 || 54–69
|- align="center" bgcolor="bbffbb"
| 124 || August 15 || @ Nationals || 4–3 || de la Rosa (6–6) || Redding (8–8) || Fuentes (23) || 27,965 || 55–69
|- align="center" bgcolor="bbffbb"
| 125 || August 16 || @ Nationals || 13–6 || Hernández (11–9) || Lannan (6–12) || || 28,909 || 56–69
|- align="center" bgcolor="bbffbb"
| 126 || August 17 || @ Nationals || 7–2 || Cook (15–8) || Pérez (5–9) || || 31,467 || 57–69
|- align="center" bgcolor="bbffbb"
| 127 || August 19 || @ Dodgers || 8–3 || Jiménez (9–11) || Kuroda (7–9) || || 46,687 || 58–69
|- align="center" bgcolor="bbffbb"
| 128 || August 20 || @ Dodgers || 4–3 || Buchholz (6–3) || Broxton (3–5) || Fuentes (24) || 48,183 || 59–69
|- align="center" bgcolor="ffbbbb"
| 129 || August 21 || @ Dodgers || 3–1 || Lowe (10–10) || de la Rosa (6–7) || Broxton (10) || 44,885 || 59–70
|- align="center" bgcolor="ffbbbb"
| 130 || August 22 || Reds || 8–5 || Harang (4–13) || Hernández (11–10) || Cordero (25) || 30,337 || 59–71
|- align="center" bgcolor="bbffbb"
| 131 || August 23 || Reds || 7–6 || Vizcaíno (1–0) || Lincoln (1–4) || Fuentes (25) || 42,282 || 60–71
|- align="center" bgcolor="bbffbb"
| 132 || August 24 || Reds || 4–3 (12) || Speier (2–1) || Lincoln (1–5) || || 31,173 || 61–71
|- align="center" bgcolor="bbffbb"
| 133 || August 25 || @ Giants || 4–2 || Francis (4–8) || Cain (8–10) || Fuentes (26) || 31,132 || 62–71
|- align="center" bgcolor="bbffbb"
| 134 || August 26 || @ Giants || 7–2 || de la Rosa (7–7) || Palmer (0–2) || Grilli (1) || 32,695 || 63–71
|- align="center" bgcolor="ffbbbb"
| 135 || August 27 || @ Giants || 4–1 || Lincecum (15–3) || Hernández (11–11) || Wilson (36) || 31,627 || 63–72
|- align="center" bgcolor="bbffbb"
| 136 || August 29 || @ Padres || 9–4 || Cook (16–8) || Hayhurst (0–1) || || 25,274 || 64–72
|- align="center" bgcolor="ffbbbb"
| 137 || August 30 || @ Padres || 9–4 || Geer (1–0) || Jiménez (9–12) || || 30,240 || 64–73
|- align="center" bgcolor="ffbbbb"
| 138 || August 31 || @ Padres || 2–1 || Hoffman (3–6) || Buchholz (6–4) || || 26,395 || 64–74
|-

|- align="center" bgcolor="bbffbb"
| 139 || September 1 || Giants || 4–0 || de la Rosa (8–7) || Sánchez (8–10) || || 31,388 || 65–74
|- align="center" bgcolor="bbffbb"
| 140 || September 2 || Giants || 6–5 (12) || Grilli (3–1) || Yabu (3–6) || || 23,710 || 66–74
|- align="center" bgcolor="ffbbbb"
| 141 || September 3 || Giants || 9–2 || Zito (9–16) || Cook (16–9) || || 23,481 || 66–75
|- align="center" bgcolor="bbffbb"
| 142 || September 5 || Astros || 5–3 || Jiménez (10–12) || Moehler (10–6) || Fuentes (27) || 26,163 || 67–75
|- align="center" bgcolor="ffbbbb"
| 143 || September 6 || Astros || 2–0 || Oswalt (14–9) || Francis (4–9) || || 32,352 || 67–76
|- align="center" bgcolor="ffbbbb"
| 144 || September 7 || Astros || 7–5 || Brocail (7–5) || Buchholz (6–5) || Valverde (40) || 30,509 || 67–77
|- align="center" bgcolor="ffbbbb"
| 145 || September 9 || @ Braves || 5–4 (10) || Tavárez (1–2) || Buchholz (6–6) || || 21,821 || 67–78
|- align="center" bgcolor="ffbbbb"
| 146 || September 10 || @ Braves || 9–5 || Bennett (3–6) || Vizcaíno (1–1) || || 19,693 || 67–79
|- align="center" bgcolor="ffbbbb"
| 147 || September 11 || @ Braves || 8–4 || Jurrjens (13–9) || Rusch (5–5) || || 20,039 || 67–80
|- align="center" bgcolor="ffbbbb"
| 148 || September 12 || Dodgers || 7–2 || Billingsley (15–10) || Francis (4–10) || || 30,147 || 67–81
|- align="center" bgcolor="ffbbbb"
| 149 || September 13 || Dodgers || 5–1 || Kershaw (4–5) || de la Rosa (8–8) || || 40,291 || 67–82
|- align="center" bgcolor="bbffbb"
| 150 || September 14 || Dodgers || 1–0 (10) || Corpas (3–3) || Kuo (5–3) || || 28,910 || 68–82
|- align="center" bgcolor="ffbbbb"
| 151 || September 15 || Padres || 11–5 || LeBlanc (1–1) || Reynolds (2–7) || || 25,296 || 68–83
|- align="center" bgcolor="bbffbb"
| 152 || September 16 || Padres || 10–3 || Jiménez (11–12) || Estes (2–3) || || 25,507 || 69–83
|- align="center" bgcolor="bbffbb"
| 153 || September 17 || Padres || 1–0 || Hernández (12–11) || Geer (2–1) || Fuentes (28) || 25,155 || 70–83
|- align="center" bgcolor="bbffbb"
| 154 || September 19 || Diamondbacks || 3–2 || de la Rosa (9–8) || Scherzer (0–3) || Fuentes (29) || 43,137 || 71–83
|- align="center" bgcolor="ffbbbb"
| 155 || September 20 || Diamondbacks || 5–3 || Peña (3–2) || Fuentes (1–5) || Qualls (6) || 38,283 || 71–84
|- align="center" bgcolor="ffbbbb"
| 156 || September 21 || Diamondbacks || 13–4 || Haren (16–8) || Reynolds (2–8) || || 32,915 || 71–85
|- align="center" bgcolor="bbffbb"
| 157 || September 23 || @ Giants || 9–4 || Jiménez (12–12) || Lincecum (17–5) || || 33,922 || 72–85
|- align="center" bgcolor="bbffbb"
| 158 || September 24 || @ Giants || 15–6 || Hernández (13–11) || Sánchez (9–12) || || 31,942 || 73–85
|- align="center" bgcolor="bbffbb"
| 159 || September 25 || @ Giants || 3–1 || de la Rosa (10–8) || Zito (10–17) || Fuentes (30) || 31,857 || 74–85
|- align="center" bgcolor="ffbbbb"
| 160 || September 26 || @ Diamondbacks || 6–4 || Cruz (4–0) || Grilli (3–2) || Qualls (8) || 34,590 || 74–86
|- align="center" bgcolor="ffbbbb"
| 161 || September 27 || @ Diamondbacks || 6–4 || Lyon (3–5) || Corpas (3–4) || Qualls (9) || 33,234 || 74–87
|- align="center" bgcolor="ffbbbb"
| 162 || September 28 || @ Diamondbacks || 2–1 || Johnson (11–10) || Vizcaíno (1–2) || || 35,908 || 74–88
|-

Roster

Player stats

Batting

Starters by position 
Note: Pos = Position; G = Games played; AB = At bats; H = Hits; Avg. = Batting average; HR = Home runs; RBI = Runs batted in

Other batters 
Note: G = Games played; AB = At bats; H = Hits; Avg. = Batting average; HR = Home runs; RBI = Runs batted in

Pitching

Starting pitchers 
Note: G = Games pitched; IP = Innings pitched; W = Wins; L = Losses; ERA = Earned run average; SO = Strikeouts

Other pitchers 
Note: G = Games pitched; IP = Innings pitched; W = Wins; L = Losses; ERA = Earned run average; SO = Strikeouts

Relief pitchers 
Note: G = Games pitched; W = Wins; L = Losses; SV = Saves; ERA = Earned run average; SO = Strikeouts

Notes

 On April 17, 2008, Colorado beat the San Diego Padres, 2-1, in a 22-inning road game that spanned 6 hours and 16 minutes.  It was the longest game in Rockies history, in terms of both total innings and total length of time.  659 total pitches were thrown in the game by 15 different pitchers (eight Rockies pitchers and seven Padres pitchers).  The 22-inning affair was the longest since August 31, 1993, when the Minnesota Twins, at home, defeated the Cleveland Indians, 5-4, in 22 innings.
 On July 1, 2008, the Rockies defeated the San Diego Padres, 4-0, in the shortest nine-inning game in Coors Field history – one hour and 58 minutes.
 On July 4, 2008, Colorado defeated the Florida Marlins, 18-17, after at one point being down, 13-4.  The nine-run deficit that the Rockies overcame made it the largest comeback win in team history.
 On September 14, 2008, the Rockies and Los Angeles Dodgers played a game that went scoreless into the bottom of the 10th inning at Coors Field.  It was the longest scoreless stretch in Coors Field history.  The Rockies eventually won the game, 1-0, as they scored the winning run in the bottom of the 10th inning.

Farm system

References

External links
2008 Colorado Rockies season at Baseball Reference

Colorado Rockies seasons
Colorado Rockies
Colorado Rockies
2000s in Denver